Thomas Gouge (19 September 1605, Bow, London – 29 October 1681, London) was an English Presbyterian clergyman, a contemporary of Samuel Pepys, associated with the Puritan movement.

Gouge was the son of William Gouge, himself a clergyman and the rector of St. Anne's church in Blackfriars.  Thomas Gouge was educated at Eton and at King's College, Cambridge, where he became a fellow in 1628.  He was the vicar of the parish of St. Sepulchre from 1638, a position he held until the Act of Uniformity in 1662.  Gouge's refusal to use the 1662 version of the Book of Common Prayer is recounted in the diary of Samuel Pepys.

Thomas Gouge was famous during his lifetime for acts of charity, especially in the aftermath of the Great Fire of London.  He provided work for the poor in flax and hemp-spinning.  He traveled extensively in Wales performing charitable works and distributing religious literature there. Gouge's best remembered work is Riches Increased by Giving to the Poor.  Gouge's funeral sermon was preached by John Tillotson.

References

External links
Collected works of Thomas Gouge, with a life of the author

1609 births
1681 deaths
People educated at Eton College
Fellows of King's College, Cambridge
English Presbyterian ministers of the Interregnum (England)
Ejected English ministers of 1662
English religious writers